John Joseph Aloysius "Rube" Cashman Jr. (March 24, 1892 – December 6, 1949) was an American basketball player and college coach. He served as the second head men's basketball coach at Villanova University from 1926 to 1929.

References

1892 births
1949 deaths
American men's basketball coaches
American men's basketball players
Basketball coaches from Pennsylvania
Basketball players from Philadelphia
Forwards (basketball)
Villanova Wildcats men's basketball coaches